In manufacturing, an undercut is a special type of recessed surface that is inaccessible using a straight tool. In turning, it refers to a recess in a diameter generally on the inside diameter of the part. In milling, it refers to a feature which is not visible when the part is viewed from the spindle. In molding, it refers to a feature that cannot be molded using only a single pull mold. In printed circuit board construction, it refers to the portion of the copper that is etched away under the photoresist.

Turning

On turned parts an undercut is also known as a neck or "relief groove". They are often used at the end of the threaded portion of a shaft or screw to provide clearance for the cutting tool.

Molding

Undercut - Any indentation or protrusion in a shape that will prevent its withdrawal from a one-piece mold.

Milling

In milling the spindle is where a cutting tool is mounted.  In some situations material must be cut from a direction where the feature can not be seen from the perspective of the spindle and requires special tooling to reach behind the visible material. 

The corners may be undercut to remove the radius that is usually left by the milling cutter this is commonly referred to as a relief.

Etching

Undercuts from etching (microfabrication) are a side effect, not an intentional feature.

Gears

References

Bibliography
. 

Mechanical engineering
Metalworking terminology
Plastics industry